Live in St. Louis is the second live album by Bosnian rock band Zabranjeno Pušenje, released on March 22, 2004. It's released through In Takt Records in Bosnia and Herzegovina, Menart Records in Croatia and Mascom Records in Serbia and Montenegro. The songs are recorded over a night at the Casa Loma Ballroom in St. Louis, Missouri, on May 26, 2002 during the band's North America Tour.

Background 
As a part of the "God Drives a Mercedes, Also" tour in May 2002, the band went to Canada and the United States. They had concerts in Toronto, Charlotte, North Carolina, Chicago, New York City, and St. Louis. On May 26, 2002, the band held a concert at the Casa Loma Ballroom in St. Louis, Missouri. The recordings from that event later will be used for the live album.

Critical reception 

Live in St. Louis has received favourable reviews from critics. Željko Draščić of the muzika.hr gave the album a positive review but had some concerns regarding final selection of songs.

Track listing
Source: Discogs

Personnel 
Credits adapted from the album's liner notes.

Zabranjeno Pušenje
 Sejo Sexon – lead vocals, acoustic guitar
 Dragomir Herendić Dragianni – guitar, backing vocals
 Predrag Bobić Bleka – bass, backing vocals
 Branko Trajkov Trak – drums
 Bruno Urlić Prco – violin, keyboards, backing vocals

Additional musicians
 Albin Jarić (credited as Jimi Rasta von Zenica) – percussion

Production
 Sejo Sexon – production
 Zoran Švigir – mastering, mixing engineer (Studio Šišmiš in Velika Gorica, Croatia)
 Dario Vitez – executive production, tour manager
 Mark Burris – recording
 Dragomir Herendić Dragianni – recording, mixing engineer
 Dijana Groth - tour lead

Design
Dario Vitez – design
Saša Midžor Sučić – photos
Branko Trajkov Trak – photos

References

2004 live albums
Zabranjeno Pušenje albums